Boucardicus divei is a species of land snail with an operculum, a terrestrial gastropod mollusk in the family Cyclophoridae.

This species is endemic to Madagascar.  Its natural habitat is subtropical or tropical dry forests. It is threatened by habitat loss.

References

Boucardicus
Molluscs of Madagascar
Gastropods described in 1993
Taxonomy articles created by Polbot
Endemic fauna of Madagascar